Israel ben Moses Najara (Yisrael ben Moshe Najarah; , Isra'il bin Musa al-Najara; c. 1555, Ottoman Empire – c. 1625, Gaza, Ottoman Empire) was a prolific Jewish liturgical poet, preacher, Biblical commentator, kabbalist (although this is disputed), and rabbi of Gaza.

Biography 
The rabbinic Najara family was originally from Nájera, a Spanish city in Northern Spain on the Najerilla river. Nájera was the former capital of the Kingdom of Navarre and in the 11th century it was incorporated into the Kingdom of Castile. In the rabbinical literature of the 16th-19th centuries, Najaras are found in Algiers, Tunis, Damascus, and Gaza.

It is believed that Najara's grandfather R' Levi Najara, was born in Spain and fled to Damascus due to the 1492 expulsion of the Jews from Spain. His father R' Moshe ben Levi Najara was born in Salonica, and in his later years moved with his family to Safed and was involved with the kabbalistic circles of the Arizal. Rabbi Israel Najara was born in Safed around 1555. He lived most of his life between Safed, Damascus, and Gaza.  Many details of his life can be inferred from his poetry. After an attack on the Jews of Safed in 1579, Najara left with his family and settled in Jobar on the outskirts of Damascus, where he served as a sofer and rabbi. He experienced unusual personal tragedy; his first wife died at a young age, and his only daughter from this marriage died at the age of ten. He eventually remarried, and some of the children from his second marriage survived into adulthood.  In his later years, he was a rabbi in Gaza, where he is buried. One of his sons, Moses Najara, was also a poet, and succeeded his father as the chief rabbi of Gaza. His grandson Yaakov Najara was embroiled in the Sabbatean controversy.

From his secular poems, which he wrote in the meters of various Spanish/Ladino, Turkish, and Greek songs, it is evident that he was familiar with several foreign languages. He traveled extensively in the Ottoman Empire; there is evidence that he visited Salonica, Istanbul and Bursa. Due to his upbringing in Safed, he came under the extensive influence of Lurianic Kabbalah.

As may be seen from his works, he was a versatile scholar, and he corresponded with many contemporary rabbis, among others with Bezaleel Ashkenazi, Yom-Ṭob Ẓahalon, Moses Hamon, and Menahem Ḥefeẓ. His poetic effusions were exceptionally numerous, and many of them were translated into Persian. While still young he composed many hymns, to Arabic and Turkish tunes, with the intention, as he says in the preface to his Zemirot Yisrael, of turning the Jewish youth from profane songs. He wrote piyyuṭim, pizmonim, seliḥot, vidduyim, and dirges for all the week-days and for Sabbaths, holy days, and occasional ceremonies, these piyyuṭim being collected in his Zemirot Yisrael. Many of the piyyuṭim are in Aramaic.

Works 
Najara's letters, secular poems, epigrams, and rhymed prose form the work entitled Meimei Yisrael (מימי ישראל) are published at the end of the second edition of the Zemirot Yisrael (זמירות ישראל). Najara's other works are as follows: 
Mesaḥeḳet ha-Tebel (Safed, 1587), an ethical poem on the nothingness of the world
Shoḥaṭe ha-Yeladim (printed with Moses Ventura's Yemin Mosheh, Amsterdam, 1718), Hebrew verse on the laws of slaughtering and porging, composed at the request of his son Moses
Ketubbat Yisrael (with Joseph Jaabez's Ma'amar ha-Aḥdut, n.p., 1794), a hymn which, in the kabalistic fashion, represents the relationship between God and Israel as one between man and wife (it was composed for the holiday of Shavuos)
A collection of hymns published by M. H. Friedländer (Vienna, 1858) under the title Pizmonim.

His unpublished works are
She'erit Yisrael, contains sixty poems and is, according to its heading, the second part of Zemirot Yisrael; it is found in the bet ha-midrash of the German community in Amsterdam. From it Leopold Dukes published one poem.
Ma'arkhot Yisrael, a commentary on the Pentateuch
Miḳveh Yisrael, sermons
Piẓ'ei Ohev, a commentary on Job.

M. Sachs attempted to render some of Najara's piyyuṭim into German.

After the ruins of the house inhabited by R. Judah he-Ḥasid at Jerusalem were cleared away in 1836, some writings of Israel Najara of the year 1579 were found.

Zemirot Yisrael 
Zemirot Yisrael, originally entitled Zemirot Yisrael Najara, was first published at Safed (1587) and contained 108 piyyuṭim and hymns. Many additional songs were printed in the Venetian edition from 1599. This edition contains the Meme Yisrael and the Mesaḥeḳet ha-Tebel additions, and is divided into three parts: 
 Olat Tamid, (עולת תמיד) containing 225 piyyuṭim organized according to the Ottoman makam system. He notes twelve makamlar: Rast, Dugah, Huseyni, Bûselik, Segâh, Segâh Irak,  Acem, Mahur, Neva Uzzal, Naks Huseyni, and Nikriz
 Olat Shabbat, (עולת שבת) containing 54 piyyuṭim for each Shabbat of the year (set to presumably well known melodies of other piyyutim, as indicated in the incipits)
 Olat Ḥodesh, (עולת חודש) containing 160 piyyuṭim and dirges for the High Holy Days, Purim, the Ninth of Ab, and occasional ceremonies. These include epic poems recounting the Hanukkah and Purim stories, as well as the piyyut sung by Sephardic communities on Shavuot "ירד דודי לגנו לערוגות בשמו" (also known as the ketubbah shel matan Torah) describing an allegorical "marriage contract" between God and Israel. It was published a third time at Belgrade (1837), but with the omission of many songs and of the two works just mentioned. Extracts from the Zemirot Yisrael were published under the title of Tefillot Nora'ot (Frankfort-on-the-Main, 1712).

Influence
Many of Najara's piyyuṭim and hymns have been taken into the rituals and maḥzorim in use among the Jews in different countries, especially in Italy and Israel.

The poetic works of Rabbi Israel Najara had considerable influence on the various baqashot traditions of Morocco, Turkey (also known as the maftirim tradition), and Syria. At least 26 compositions by Najara are part of the Moroccan baqashot canon, and roughly 8 of the 66 Syrian baqashot were composed by Najara (יאמר נא ישראל, ימותי כלו כצבאות, אנא הושע מאור עיני, אשיר  עז, יודוך רעיוני, יה אלה מלכות, יה רבון עלם, יוםליום אודה). The Jews of Aleppo sing on Shabbat eve many beautiful hymns and recite many prayers, most of which are by Najara.

The best known of his hymns are Yah Ribbon 'Alam, (יה רבון עלם) recited on the Sabbath by the Jews of various countries, as well as Yodukha Ra'ayonay (יודוך רעיוני) and Yarhiq Nedod (ירחיק נדוד).

Critical Reception 
For some of his poetic innovations - for example his hymns on the marriage of God and Israel - Najara was severely criticized by Menahem Lonzano when the latter was in Damascus.

The Shibḥei Ḥayyim Viṭal contains a violent attack (accusations included: use of foul language, being a drunkard, homosexuality, and sexual relations with non-Jewish women) by Hayyim Vital upon a poet whose name is not mentioned, but whom some take to be Israel Najara. (It was later discovered that Vital actually had named Najara, but this had been censored out until the 1954 publication of Sefer HaḤezyonot based on Vital's own autograph manuscript.) However, Vital did not make these accusations based on observation, but rather based on mystical revelations which he claimed to have received from a spirit. Despite the accusations, Isaac Luria, Vital's teacher, declared that Najara's hymns were listened to with delight in heaven. Najara's piyyuṭim were praised also by Leon of Modena, who composed a song in his honor, which was printed at the beginning of the Olat Shabbat, the second part of the Zemirot Yisrael.

References

 Its bibliography:
 Chaim Azulai, Shem ha-Gedolim, ii, s.v. Zemirot Yisrael;
 Simon Bernfeld, in Ha-Asif, iv, section 4, pp. 18 et seq.;
 David Conforte, Ḳore ha-Dorot, pp. 37a, 41a, 49b;
 Dukes, Zur Kenntniss, pp. 9, 138, No. 8;
 Fuenn, Keneset Yisrael, p. 699;
 Julius Fürst, Bibl. Jud. iii.12;
 Heinrich Grätz, Gesch., 3rd ed., ix.395;
 Landshuth,  'Ammude ha-'Abodah, pp. 135 et seq.;
 Orient. Lit. iv.649 et seq.;
 Moritz Steinschneider, Cat. Bodl. cols. 1170–1171;
 idem, Jewish Literature, pp. 155, 243;
 Zunz, Literaturgesch. p. 419.

External links
 1587 Safed Edition of Zemirot Yisrael
 1599 Venice Edition of Zemirot Yisrael
 Iraqi melody for Yah Ribbon 'Alam (יה רבון עלם)
 Traditional Syrian melody for Yarhiq Nedod (ירחיק נדוד)
 Ottoman/Turkish melody for Yodukha Ra'ayonay (יודוך רעיוני) from the Maftirim baqashot tradition

1550s births
1620s deaths
Year of birth uncertain
Year of death uncertain
16th-century rabbis from the Ottoman Empire
17th-century rabbis from the Ottoman Empire
Burials in Gaza
Hebrew-language poets
Jewish poets
Land of Israel
People from Damascus
People from Gaza City
Rabbis in Safed
Ottoman Arabic poets
Sephardi rabbis in Ottoman Palestine